Rika Fujiwara and Hsieh Shu-ying were the defending champions, however they both chose not to participate.

The Ukrainian-duo of Anhelina Kalinina and Oleksandra Korashvili won the title, defeating the top seeds, Verónica Cepede Royg and María Irigoyen in the final, 6–1, 6–4.

Seeds

Draw

References 
 Draw

Wilde Lexus Women's USTA Pro Circuit Event - Doubles